Clare Frances Elizabeth Higgins (born 10 November 1955) is an English actress. Her film appearances include Hellraiser (1987), 
Hellbound: Hellraiser II (1988), Small Faces (1996) and The Golden Compass (2007). 

A six-time Olivier Award nominee for her work in the theatre, Higgins received her first nomination in 1984 for her role as Stella Kowalski in A Streetcar Named Desire. She has since won the Olivier Award for Best Actress three times; for Sweet Bird of Youth in 1995, Vincent in Brixton in 2003 and Hecuba in 2005. She made her Broadway debut in 2003 in Vincent in Brixton, receiving a Tony Award nomination for Best Actress in a Play. She returned to Broadway in the 2014 revival of A Delicate Balance.

Early life 
Higgins, the second of five children, was born in Bradford, to Paula Cecilia (née Murphy) and James Stephen Higgins. Her parents were from working class Irish Catholic backgrounds, and worked as teachers. Higgins was interested in acting since her childhood. After being expelled from a convent school, she ran away from home at seventeen. At 19, she gave birth to a boy but gave him up for adoption at her social worker's insistence.

Career 
At 23, Higgins graduated from the London Academy of Music and Dramatic Art (LAMDA). Through the 1980s, she became a dynamic stage actress, both in London and on Broadway. She starred in the premiere of David Hare's The Secret Rapture, and won the first of her three Olivier Awards in 1995. In 1983, she starred with Ben Cross in the BBC's serial version of A.J. Cronin's The Citadel, playing the role of Christine Manson. For the big screen, Higgins played Julia Cotton in Clive Barker's Hellraiser (1987), based on Barker's novella The Hellbound Heart. She reprised the role for Tony Randel's Hellbound: Hellraiser II (1988). Her other film credits include the Scottish film Small Faces (1996). In 2000 she appeared in Catherine Cookson's "The Secret" TV mini series as Maggie Hewitt, also in Woody Allen's Cassandra's Dream (2007), and The Golden Compass (2007).

Higgins appeared as Jocasta in the National Theatre's critically acclaimed production of Oedipus, opposite Ralph Fiennes in the title role. From April to May 2009, she appeared in Wallace Shawn's The Fever at the Royal Court Theatre.

From mid-May to September 2009, she appeared as the Countess Rossillion in All's Well That Ends Well at the National Theatre (Olivier stage).

On 30 September 2012, Higgins appeared in Season 3, episode 3 of Downton Abbey as Mrs Bartlett, a friend of Mrs Bates who eventually helps in the release of Mr Bates from prison.

On 14 November 2013, she appeared in the Doctor Who mini-episode "The Night of the Doctor", which starred Paul McGann as the Eighth Doctor. Higgins played Ohila, the leader of the Sisterhood of Karn. In 2014 she appeared in Father Brown "The Daughters of Jerusalem" as Dinah Fortescue.  Higgins returned to the role of Ohila in 2015 in "The Magician's Apprentice", which originally aired on 19 September 2015, and in the series finale "Hell Bent" on 5 December 2015. The same year she appeared in EastEnders, as prosecuting lawyer Hazel Warren.

In January 2017, Higgins appeared in CBBC's adaptation of Jill Murphy's The Worst Witch as Miss Ada Cackle, and her wicked twin sister Agatha.

Acting awards and nominations 
Higgins was awarded the Laurence Olivier Theatre Award in 1995 (1994 season) for Best Actress in a Play for her performance in Sweet Bird of Youth at the Royal National Theatre. She won the same award in both 2002 and 2005: in 2002 for her performance in Vincent in Brixton performed at the Royal National Theatre, Cottesloe and Wyndham's Theatres, and in 2005 for her performance as Hecuba in the Euripides tragedy at the Donmar Warehouse. She was awarded the 2002 London Critics' Circle Theatre Award for Best Actress for her performance in Vincent in Brixton. Additionally, she was awarded the 1994 London Critics Circle Theatre Award (Drama Theatre) for Best Actress for her performances in The Children's Hour and Sweet Bird of Youth. She was also awarded the 2002 London Evening Standard Theatre Award for Best Actress for her performance in Vincent in Brixton at the Donmar Warehouse in London. In 2003, she was nominated for a Tony Award as Best Actress in a Play for Vincent in Brixton on Broadway, and garnered the 2003 Theatre World Award for outstanding major Broadway debut.

Filmography 
 Nineteen Nineteen (1985)
 Hellraiser (1987)
 Hellbound: Hellraiser II (1988)
 The Fruit Machine (1988)
 Bad Behaviour (1993)
 Circle of Deceit (1993, TV film)
 Fatherland (1994, TV film)
 Small Faces (1996)
 B. Monkey (1998)
 The House of Mirth (2000)
 Stage Beauty (2004)
 The Libertine (2004)
 Bigger Than the Sky (2005)
 Mrs. Palfrey at the Claremont (2005)
 Cassandra's Dream (2007)
 The Golden Compass (2007)
 Being Human (2009)
 Toast (2010, TV movie)
 A Fantastic Fear of Everything (2012)
 The Syndicate (2012)
 I Give It a Year (2013)
 Doctor Who (2013, 2015)
 The Worst Witch (2017)
 Into the Badlands (2018)
 Ready Player One (2018)
 Cleaning Up (2019)
 The Sandman (2022)

Selected theatre performances
 Countess Hechingen in The Deep Man by Hugo von Hofmannsthal. British premiere directed by Casper Wrede at the Royal Exchange, Manchester (1979).
 Alexa Rollo in Rollo by Marcel Achard. Directed by David Thompson at the Royal Exchange, Manchester (1980).
 Judith in Blood, Black and Gold by Gerard McLarnon. World premiere directed by Braham Murray at the Royal Exchange, Manchester (1980).
 Isabella in Measure for Measure. Directed by Braham Murray at the Royal Exchange, Manchester (1981).

References

External links 
 
 Interview 07/2003 (The Independent)

1955 births
Living people
20th-century English actresses
21st-century English actresses
Actresses from Bradford
Alumni of the London Academy of Music and Dramatic Art
Audiobook narrators
Critics' Circle Theatre Award winners
English film actresses
English people of Irish descent
English radio actresses
English Shakespearean actresses
English television actresses
Laurence Olivier Award winners
Theatre World Award winners